Funny Face was a brand of powdered drink mix originally made and publicly sold by the Pillsbury Company from 1964 to 1994, and in limited productions (mainly in the Midwestern and New England regions of the U.S.A.) from 1994 to 2001. The brand was introduced as competition to the similar (and more familiar and better-selling) Kool-Aid made by Kraft Foods. The product came in assorted flavors sweetened with artificial sweetener, and was mixed with water to make a beverage. 

The product name "Funny Face" was based on the packaging and advertising created by Hal Silverman of the Campbell Mithun advertising agency. Each flavor was designated by a cartoon character with a presumably amusing face. The original flavors, and their names, were Goofy Grape, Rootin' Tootin' Raspberry, Freckle-Face Strawberry, Injun Orange, and Chinese Cherry. These last two, being ethnic stereotypes considered offensive by that time, were soon renamed to Jolly-Olly Orange and Choo Choo Cherry. Additional flavors were added later, including Captain Black Cherry, Chilly Cherry Cola, Lefty Lemonade (and Lefty Lemon-Lime), Loud Mouth Lime (and Loud Mouth Punch), Pistol Pink Lemonade, Rah-Rah Root Beer, Rudi Tutti-Frutti, Tart Lil' Imitation Lemonade, Tart 'N' Tangy Lemon, With-It Watermelon, Top Banana, and Chug-a-Lug-a Chocolate, the last intended to be mixed with milk rather than water.

The mix was sweetened with calcium cyclamate. Cyclamates and their salts (including calcium cyclamate and sodium cyclamate) were banned in the United States in 1970; Calcium cyclamate was briefly replaced by saccharin, which proved unpopular, after which the product was offered unsweetened.

Various promotional tchotchkes were offered as premiums in support of the brand, such as mugs and pitchers bearing the likeness of the various cartoon faces associated with each flavor. A series of children's books such as "How Freckle Face Strawberry Got His Name" and similar titles were published.

The brand's tagline was "Funny Face is Fun To Drink!"

The Funny Face brand was purchased by Brady Enterprises in 1980, and continued to sell nationwide until 1994. A limited production relaunch (albeit with some modifications) was briefly sold in selected areas from 1994 to 2001. On November 28, 2012, Decas Cranberry Products of Carver, Massachusetts resurrected the names and personas of four of the original characters – Rootin' Tootin' Raspberry, Freckle Face Strawberry, Choo Choo Cherry, and Goofy Grape – for a line of flavored dried cranberry and fruit snacks.

It got somewhat popular with Smashing, Juicy and Mully’s VR videos. The popularized character of said videos was “Goofy Grape” (Goofy Gwape as they would say).

Notes

References

Further reading
 (Children's book)

Products introduced in 1964
Powdered drink mixes
Fruit and vegetable characters